Attorney General Kent may refer to:

James M. Kent (1872–1939), Attorney General of Newfoundland
Benjamin Kent (1708–1788), Attorney General of Massachusetts